Parliamentary elections were held in Iran on 4 August 1967. The result was a victory for the New Iran Party, which won 180 of the 219 seats in the Majlis. Voter turnout was around 35%.

Simultaneous elections were also held for a Constitutional Assembly in order for amendments to be made to the constitution to designate a regent, as well as an election for Senate.

Results

Majlis

Senate

Constitutional Assembly

References

Iran
1967 elections in Iran
Iranian Senate elections
National Consultative Assembly elections
Lower house elections in Iran
August 1967 events in Asia